Meditations on the Tarot:  A Journey into Christian Hermeticism is an esoteric Christian book originally written in French with the date of 21 May 1967 given by the author at the end of the last chapter, and published posthumously and anonymously in 1980.  This was followed by translation into German (Die großen Arcana des Tarot : Meditationen).  An English translation was then published in 1985, with Robert A. Powell basing his rendering on the author's original French manuscript, whereas the published French edition does not always follow the French original manuscript.

The author is known, but requested to remain anonymous. It is included in the bibliography of books ascribed to Valentin Tomberg.

The afterword states that "The author wished to remain anonymous in order to allow the work to speak for itself, to avoid the interposition of any kind of personal element between the work and the reader - reasons that we respect."

The author is clearly a Roman Catholic, although the ideas expressed are often not commonly associated with Catholic dogma.
The body of the work is divided into 22 chapters, called "letters", with a Foreword by the author and an afterword by Hans Urs von Balthasar, a Swiss theologian nominated to be a cardinal. Each chapter is centered on a card from the Major Arcana of the Tarot of Marseilles.

Each card is taken as an "arcanum," which the author defines in part in Letter I: The Magician as "that which it is necessary to 'know' in order to be fruitful in a given domain of spiritual life. ... a 'ferment' or an 'enzyme' whose presence stimulates the spiritual and the psychic life of man." He writes that they "are neither allegories nor secrets ... [but] authentic symbols ... [which] conceal and reveal their sense at one and the same time according to the depth of meditation." The symbolism of the cards is taken as a springboard for discussing and describing various aspects of Christian spiritual life and growth.

Sources cited in the work are many; the most common one is the Bible, followed by an array of saints, theologians, mystics, philosophers, occultists, and other writers, notably including Henri Bergson, Buddha, Goethe, Jung, Kant, Eliphas Lévi, Nietzsche, Fabre d'Olivet, Origen, Papus, Joséphin Péladan, Philip of Lyons, Plato, St. Albertus Magnus, St. Anthony the Great, St. Augustine, St. Bonaventura, St. Dionysius the Areopagite, St. Francis of Assisi, St. John of the Cross, St. Theresa of Ávila, St. Thomas Aquinas, Louis-Claude de Saint-Martin, Saint-Yves d'Alveydre, Rudolf Steiner, Pierre Teilhard de Chardin, Laozi, Hermes Trismegistus, and Oswald Wirth (major entries taken in alphabetical order from the index).

References

External links 
 Meditations on the Tarot:  A Journey into Christian Hermeticism

Books about Christianity
Tarotology